The Nobeyama Radio Observatory (NRO) is a division of the National Astronomical Observatory of Japan (NAOJ) and consists of three radio instruments located near Minamimaki, Nagano at an elevation of 1350m.

The 45m Radio Telescope: A 45m single-dish radio telescope that operates in short-millimetre wavelengths. Its receivers operate at 1, 2, 3.75, 9.4, 17, 35, and 80 GHz in both left and right polarizations.
The Nobeyama Millimetre Array (NMA): An millimetre interferometer consisting of six 10m diameter telescopes.
The Nobeyama Radioheliograph (NoRH): An array of eighty-four, 80 cm antennas dedicated for solar observations. Its receivers operate at 17–34 GHz in both left and right polarizations.
The Nobeyama Radio Polarimeters: A set of radio telescopes that continuously observes the full Sun at the frequencies of 1, 2, 3.75, 9.4, 17, 35, and 80 GHz, at left and right circular polarization.

References

External links

 Official English website of the NRO

Radio observatories
Minamimaki, Nagano